Brixworth Country Park lies next to Pitsford Water in Northamptonshire, England.

Opened in 1997 it includes cycle hire, cafeteria and WCs. The site has easy access to the  footpath/cyclepath that circumnavigates the water, as well as bird-watching facilities and picnic areas. There is also a small privately run cycle shop which hires out bikes for people who would like to cycle around Pitsford Reservoir. The park is run by Northamptonshire County Council.

Country parks in Northamptonshire